Yelena Anatolyevna Alexandrova is a former Soviet figure skater.

Results

References

 Elena Anatolyevna Alexandrova

Navigation

Soviet female single skaters
Living people
1950 births
Figure skaters from Saint Petersburg